Amphitecna is a genus of plants in the family Bignoniaceae.

Species include:
Amphitecna apiculata A.H.Gentry
Amphitecna breedlovei A.H.Gentry
Amphitecna costata A.H.Gentry
Amphitecna donnell-smithii (Sprague) L.O.Williams
Amphitecna gentryi W.C.Burger
Amphitecna isthmica (A.H.Gentry) A.H.Gentry
Amphitecna kennedyi (A.H.Gentry) A.H.Gentry
Amphitecna latifolia (Mill.) A.H.Gentry
Amphitecna lundellii A.H.Gentry
Amphitecna macrophylla (Seem.) Miers ex Baill.
Amphitecna molinae L.O.Williams
Amphitecna montana L.O.Williams
Amphitecna parviflora A.H.Gentry
Amphitecna regalis (Linden) A.H.Gentry
Amphitecna sessilifolia (Donn.Sm.) L.O.Williams
Amphitecna silvicola L.O.Williams
Amphitecna spathicalyx (A.H.Gentry) A.H.Gentry
Amphitecna steyermarkii (A.H.Gentry) A.H.Gentry
Amphitecna tuxtlensis A.H.Gentry

References

 
Bignoniaceae genera
Taxonomy articles created by Polbot